Cyperus wissmannii is a species of sedge that is native to north eastern parts of Africa and south western parts of the Middle East.

See also 
 List of Cyperus species

References 

wissmannii
Plants described in 1939
Flora of Yemen
Flora of Oman
Flora of Ethiopia